Time Odyssey may refer to:
Time Odyssey (album), a 1988 album by guitarist Vinnie Moore
A Time Odyssey, a series of novels co-written by Arthur C. Clarke and Stephen Baxter